Podscope was the first consumer search engine to create a 'spoken word index' for podcasts. Originally launched in April 2005, it creates an index against every spoken word within the audio/video content.  Users can search for a term or phrase and then go right to the portion of the podcast that contains the search term. User searches generate a list of ranked results, providing the most relevant podcasts as well as links to play or download the content. Podscope was created by TVEyes Inc.

External links
 The Podscope Search Engine
 TVEyes

Internet search engines